Arndt Verlag is a German publishing house that belongs to the publishing group of the neo-Nazi publisher . It specialises in historical negationist literature. Arndt's authors include  David Irving, Wilfred von Oven, Franz Kurowski and Franz W. Seidler.

History and reception
Arndt Verlag was founded in 1963 by Heinz von Arndt, who was a member of the neo-Nazi Deutsche Reichspartei and later of the NPD. In 1983, the publisher  took over the publishing house and integrated it into his publishing company. Munier built Arndt into one of the largest and most important right-wing publishing houses in Germany.

According to the State Office for the Protection of the Constitution of Schleswig-Holstein, Arndt Verlag is trying to "give readers a positive picture of the national-socialist terror". The Federal Office for the Protection of the Constitution mentions the publishing house in its reports for 2009, 2010, 2011 and 2012. Its illustrated books "gloss over the Nazi period" and glorify the military techniques of the "Third Reich". Arndt's publications advance a German claim over the Sudetenland.

Authors
Arndt Verlag's authors included Holocaust deniers and pro-Nazi authors such as:
David Irving
Franz Kurowski
Wilfred von Oven
Franz W. Seidler

See also
Holocaust denial
Myth of the clean Wehrmacht
Waffen-SS in popular culture

References

Historical negationism
Propaganda legends
Publishing companies of Germany
Cold War history of Germany